Bengt Asplund (born 30 March 1957) is a Swedish former cyclist. He competed at the 1980 Summer Olympics and 1984 Summer Olympics.

References

External links
 

1957 births
Living people
Swedish male cyclists
Olympic cyclists of Sweden
Cyclists at the 1980 Summer Olympics
Cyclists at the 1984 Summer Olympics
Sportspeople from Värmland County